The meridian 91° east of Greenwich is a line of longitude that extends from the North Pole across the Arctic Ocean, Asia, the Indian Ocean, the Southern Ocean, and Antarctica to the South Pole.

The 91st meridian east forms a great circle with the 89th meridian west.

From Pole to Pole
Starting at the North Pole and heading south to the South Pole, the 91st meridian east passes through:

{| class="wikitable plainrowheaders"
! scope="col" width="120" | Co-ordinates
! scope="col" | Country, territory or sea
! scope="col" | Notes
|-
| style="background:#b0e0e6;" | 
! scope="row" style="background:#b0e0e6;" | Arctic Ocean
| style="background:#b0e0e6;" |
|-
| 
! scope="row" | 
| Krasnoyarsk Krai — Schmidt Island, Severnaya Zemlya
|-valign="top"
| style="background:#b0e0e6;" | 
! scope="row" style="background:#b0e0e6;" | Kara Sea
| style="background:#b0e0e6;" | Passing just west of Pioneer Island, Severnaya Zemlya, Krasnoyarsk Krai, 
|-
| 
! scope="row" | 
| Krasnoyarsk Krai — Sedov Archipelago, Severnaya Zemlya
|-
| style="background:#b0e0e6;" | 
! scope="row" style="background:#b0e0e6;" | Kara Sea
| style="background:#b0e0e6;" | Passing just east of the Kirov Islands, Krasnoyarsk Krai, 
|-valign="top"
| 
! scope="row" | 
| Krasnoyarsk Krai Republic of Khakassia — from  Krasnoyarsk Krai — from  Tuva Republic — from 
|-
| 
! scope="row" | 
|
|-valign="top"
| 
! scope="row" |  
| Xinjiang
|-
| 
! scope="row" | 
|
|-valign="top"
| 
! scope="row" |  
| Xinjiang - for about 
|-
| 
! scope="row" | 
|
|-valign="top"
| 
! scope="row" |  
|-
| 
! scope="row" | 
|
|-valign="top"
| 
! scope="row" | 
| Assam Meghalaya — from 
|-
| 
! scope="row" | 
| Mainland and islands in the Ganges Delta
|-
| style="background:#b0e0e6;" | 
! scope="row" style="background:#b0e0e6;" | Indian Ocean
| style="background:#b0e0e6;" |
|-
| style="background:#b0e0e6;" | 
! scope="row" style="background:#b0e0e6;" | Southern Ocean
| style="background:#b0e0e6;" |
|-
| 
! scope="row" | Antarctica
| Australian Antarctic Territory, claimed by 
|-
|}

e091 meridian east